Muedzul Lail Tan Kiram (born 28 August 1966) is the head of the Royal House of Sulu, a position which he has held since 16 February 1986. As the eldest son of the former Sultan Mohammad Mahakuttah Abdulla Kiram (who reigned 1974–1986), he is the legitimate heir claimant to the throne of the Sultanate of Sulu. He is a pretender to the throne as the 35th Sultan of Sulu.

Personal life 
Muedzul Lail Tan Kiram was born on 28 August 1966 on the island of Jolo in present-day Philippines, the eldest son of Mohammad Mahakuttah Abdulla Kiram, 34th Sultan of Sulu and North Borneo and his first wife Dayang-Dayang Farida Tan-Kiram.

Muedzul Lail Tan Kiram studied at Universidad de Zamboanga in Zamboanga City where he got his Bachelor of Arts (BA) degree. Between 1995 and 1996, he continued his higher studies in Islam in Lahore, Pakistan. As of 2016, he lives on the island of Jolo. Currently, he is also involved as a local civic leader on the island and Sulu in general, regularly meeting with the local population.

He is married to Ampun Dayang Babai Mellany S. Kiram and has seven children:

 Raja Muda Moh. Ehsn S. Kiram
 Datu Nizamuddin S. Kiram
 Dayang-Dayang Rahela S. Kiram
 Datu Jihad S. Kiram
 Datu Mujahid S. Kiram
 Dayang-Dayang Redha S. Kiram
 Datu Mahakuttah S. Kiram

Coronation 
Datu Muedzul Lail Tan Kiram was crowned as Raja Muda (Crown Prince) of Sulu on 24 May 1974 beside his father in Sulu, under Memorandum Order No. 427, which was issued by President Ferdinand Marcos, President of Philippines. The ceremony was held in Jolo, Sulu. Muedzul Lail Tan Kiram is the last recognised Raja Muda (Crown Prince) by the Philippine government. When his father died in 1986, Muedzul Lail Tan Kiram could not take the crown because of his age, which led to relatives trying to claim the crown for themselves.

Raja Muda Muedzul Lail Tan Kiram was crowned Sultan in a coronation event on the island of Jolo on 16 September 2012.

Acceptance 
The Mindanao Examiner recognizes Sultan Kiram as the "legitimate Sultan of Sulu and North Borneo."

Sultan Kiram is acknowledged as the Sultan of Sulu by the former Chairman of the Mindanao Development Authority, Emmanuel Piñol.

Nikkei Asia identifies him as the "reigning sultan" of Sulu.

The Financial Times describes Muedzul Lail Tan Kiram as the "living sultan of Sulu".

A leading broadsheet in the Philippines, the Daily Tribune constantly publishes Sultan Muedzul Kiram as the Sultan of Sulu.

On his official Twitter account, Teodoro Locsin Jr., former Secretary of Foreign Affairs (Philippines) acknowledged a letter addressed to him from Sultan Kiram.

Royal and Hashemite Order of the Pearl 
Sultan Muedzul Lail Tan Kiram awards the Royal and Hashemite Order of the Pearl as a formal Royal Honour. Notable members of the Order include Nobel Peace Prize awardee and President of Poland Lech Walesa. The Philippine government has officially recognized the continued existence of the Sultanate of Sulu as recorded on the Philippine Gazette in 1957 and 1962.

Regnal name 
Kiram's full regnal name is His Royal Majesty Paduka Mahasari Al-Maulana Ampun Sultan Hadji Muedzul-Lail Tan Kiram ibni Almarhum Sultan Mohammad Mahakuttah Abdulla Kiram, The 35th Sultan of Sulu and North Borneo.

Honours and awards
Muedzul Lail Tan Kiram has received honours from a number of Royal Houses and other awards:

  Grand Cross, Order of the Eagle of Georgia and the Seamless Tunic of Our Lord Jesus Christ (Georgia)
  Grand Cordon, Imperial Order of the Dragon of Annam (Vietnam)
  Grand Cordon, Order of the Ethiopian Lion
  Royal Order of the Engabu (Kingdom of Bunyoro-Kitara - Uganda)
  Honorary Cross, Royal and merciful Society of Belgium
 US President's Lifetime Achievement Award
 Grand Cross of the Royal Confraternity Of Saint Teotonio
Accademico d'Onore Classe Speciale - Real Academia Sancti Ambrosii Martyris Italia

2013 Lahad Datu standoff 

Sultan Muedzul Lail Tan Kiram clearly and emphatically decried these actions led by Jamalul Kiram III, a self-proclaimed pretender to the throne in a press release and on a Malaysiakini TV interview.

Genealogy 
Muedzul Lail Tan Kiram is the grandson of Sultan Mohammed Esmail Kiram (1950–1973) while Sultan Muwallil Wasit II (1936) was his great-grandfather and Sultan Jamalul Kiram II (1893–1936) was his great-granduncle. He is a direct male descendant and the legitimate heir to throne of the Sultanate of Sulu.

Ancestry 

Muedzul Lail Tan Kiram's patriline is the line from which he is descended father to son.

House of Kiram

 Sultan Alimud Din I
 Sultan Sharapud Din
 Sultan Alimud Din II
 Sultan Jamalul Kiram I
 Sultan Mohammed Polalun Kiram
 Sultan Jamalul Alam
 Sultan Mawallil Wasit Kiram
 Sultan Mohammed Esmail Kiram
 Sultan Mohammed Mahakuttah Kiram
 Raja Muda Muedzul Lail Tan Kiram

References

External links 
Royal and Hashemite Order of the Pearl of Sulu
 The official website of Royal House of Sulu 
 Line of succession of the Sultans of Sulu of the Modern Era from the Official Gazette of the Republic of the Philippines

1966 births
Filipino people of Chinese descent
People from Sulu
Filipino datus, rajas and sultans
Filipino Muslims
Claimants of the Sultanate of Sulu throne
Living people
Tausūg people